Thomas Baker Knight Jr. (July 4, 1933 – October 12, 2005) was an American songwriter and musician. His best known compositions were "Lonesome Town", "The Wonder of You", and "Don't the Girls All Get Prettier at Closing Time". His songs have been recorded by Ricky Nelson, Paul McCartney, Dean Martin, The Cramps, Elvis Presley, Frank Sinatra, Perry Como, Mickey Gilley, Sammy Davis Jr. and Jerry Lee Lewis.

Life and career
He was born in Birmingham, Alabama, to Thomas Baker Knight Sr. and his wife Mary (Obear) Knight. His father died in 1939 at the age of 32, and because of his mother's poor health Knight was raised mainly by relatives. He learned to play guitar while serving in the Air Force, and after his discharge entered the University of Alabama, where he wrote music in his spare time. In 1956 he founded a rockabilly group, Baker Knight and the Knightmares, with Shuler Brown (bass), A.D. Derby (keyboards), Bill Weinstein (drums), Glenn Lane (sax), and Nat Tortorici (sax). Their debut single, "Bop Boogie to the Blues", was released on Kit Records that year. The next release, "Bring My Cadillac Back", was a local hit and was picked up for national distribution by Decca Records, but radio stations refused to play it as it served as unpaid advertising for Cadillac cars. Decca held on to Knight and had him release three solo records featuring arrangements by Ray Ellis: "Reelin' and Rockin' (Bippin' and Boppin' Over You)", "Just a Little Bit More", and "Love-A Love-A Love-A". None sold well, and Decca dropped his contract soon afterwards.

Knight moved to Hollywood in 1958 in hopes of pursuing a career in acting, but was unsuccessful. He became friends with Eddie Cochran and Cochran's girlfriend, songwriter Sharon Sheeley, who had written "Poor Little Fool" for Ricky Nelson, and they helped him find work as a songwriter. Knight wrote "Lonesome Town", which became a hit for Nelson in 1958, as did the B-side, Knight's "I Got a Feeling". Nelson continued to record Knight's songs, many of which became hits, including "Never Be Anyone Else But You", "Sweeter Than You", and "I Wanna Be Loved". However, he refused to let Nelson record his tune "Just Relax", which he instead released himself as a solo single in 1959, with Cochran on guitar, for Coral Records. Neither this nor the next, "Pretty Little Girl", sold well and Coral dropped his contract.

Knight then wrote "The Wonder of You" for Perry Como, but Ray Peterson recorded it instead at the behest of Como's arranger Dick Pierce, and the song became a hit in both the U.S. and UK. Elvis Presley later recorded it with even greater success. Knight continued to record solo with RCA, Chess, Reprise, and Challenge, but never with much luck. He pursued his movie career, but he only appeared on screen once, in the 1966 B-movie, Swamp Country. He had a small part as a strolling minstrel and sang several of his own songs.

In 1966, Dean Martin picked up "Somewhere There's a Someone", the first of eleven of Knight's songs he would cover. Frank Sinatra recorded a handful of Knight tunes, including "Anytime at All". Knight also wrote psychedelic music for the West Coast Pop Art Experimental Band in the late 1960s.

In 1971, he teamed with producer Jimmy Bowen and singers Kim Carnes and Mike Settle to create the bubblegum pop studio group The Sugar Bears. An album, Presenting the Sugar Bears, and three singles were released with one song, Knight's "You Are The One", reaching #51 on the Billboard charts.

Knight turned to country music in the 1970s, writing songs for Ernest Ashworth, Hank Williams, Jr., Jerry Lee Lewis, Dave & Sugar, and Mickey Gilley, whose No. 1 hit "Don't the Girls All Get Prettier at Closing Time" won Knight the Academy of Country Music's Song of the Year in 1976.

In 1985, Knight returned to Birmingham, suffering from chronic fatigue syndrome and agoraphobia, and his output decreased considerably. In the 1990s, he set up his own home studio and self-released several solo albums through his website, including The Way I Hear It, Music Is My Woman, and Music for Romantic Dreamers, the last one all instrumental. Knight published a memoir entitled A Piece of the Big-Time (my songs - my success - my struggle for survival) in 2005 just before his death.

Thomas Baker Knight Jr. died in Birmingham, Alabama, in 2005 at the age of 72. He was survived by his daughter, singer-actress Tuesday Knight, and his son, Dr. Thomas Baker Knight III.

Discography

Singles

Albums

Compilations

References

External resources
 Label scans at www.45cat.com
 Discography at wangdangdula.com
 Sessionography and discography at Prague Frank's Country Music Discographies

1933 births
2005 deaths
People with chronic fatigue syndrome
Writers from Birmingham, Alabama
Musicians from Birmingham, Alabama
Songwriters from Alabama
American rockabilly musicians
Jubilee Records artists
Challenge Records artists
RCA Victor artists
Chess Records artists
20th-century American musicians
Country musicians from Alabama
Ramsay High School alumni